The 1937 Michigan Wolverines football team was an American football team that represented the University of Michigan in the 1937 Big Ten Conference football season. In their ninth season under head coach Harry Kipke, the Wolverines compiled a 4–4 record (3–3 against Big Ten opponents) and tied for fourth place in the Big Ten. Kipke was fired after the season, having compiled a 46–26–4 record in nine years as Michigan's head coach.

After losing its first three games, the team won four consecutive games before losing to Ohio State in the final game of the season. The team was outscored by a combined total of 110 to 54, ranking 106th of 126 teams in major college football with an average of 6.8 points scored per game.

Guard Ralph Heikkinen was named the team's most valuable player and also received first-team honors on the 1937 All-Big Ten Conference football team. Center Joe Rinaldi was the team captain.

Schedule

Season summary

Pre-season
During the 1936 football season, Michigan compiled a 1–7 record (0–5 against conference opponents) and finished in last place in the Big Ten Conference. The team had compiled a 2–14 conference record since the 1933 season.

In December 1936, unhappiness with the team's performance was widespread, and the press reported that the school was intent on making sweeping changes and that chances were remote for the return of head coach Harry Kipke. In January 1937, in what was described in the press as "a compromise shakeup", the university fired Franklin Cappon as the team's line coach and assistant athletic director but retained Kipke as head coach for the 1937 season. The press reported that Kipke's retention was in part due to the failure to find a suitable replacement following a careful search. Cappon's dismissal was viewed as a victory for Kipke who had broken relations during the 1936 season. Bennie Oosterbaan and Wally Weber also retained their positions as assistant coaches responsible for the team's ends and backfield players.

The team filled out its coaching staff in February 1937, hiring Hunk Anderson as the line coach to replace Cappon.

Week 1: Michigan State

On October 2, 1937, Michigan opened its season with a 19–14 loss to Michigan State in front of a crowd of 71,200 at Michigan Stadium. The defeat was the fourth in a row for Michigan against Charlie Bachman's Spartans – the first time in Michigan football history that any team had secured four consecutive victories over the Wolverines. After a scoreless first half, the Spartans scored three touchdowns in the second half, led by halfback John Pingel who threw two touchdown passes to Ole Nelson. Michigan State's Gene Ciolek also scored on an 89-yard run. For the Wolverines, Hercules Renda caught a touchdown pass from Stark Ritchie, and Fred Trosko scored on a run through center from inside the one-yard line. Trosko also kicked two points after touchdown.

Week 2: at Northwestern

On October 9, 1937, Michigan lost to Northwestern, winner of the 1936 Big Ten championship, by a 7–0 score at Dyche Stadium in Evanston, Illinois. Despite the defeat, Michigan tackle Don Siegel was credited with completely stopping Northwestern's rushing attack on the left side to the point that Northwestern ceased running to his side after the first quarter. After a scoreless first half, Northwestern capitalized after intercepting a Douglas Farmer pass near midfield in the third quarter. The Wildcats scored on a 15-yard pass from Don Heap to Cleo Diehl. The Wolverines out-gained the Wildcats on the ground by 125 rushing yards to 106, but the Wildcats exceeded the Wolverines in the air by a margin of 128 passing yards to 70.

Week 3: Minnesota

On October 16, 1937, in the annual Little Brown Jug rivalry game, Michigan lost to Bernie Bierman's Minnesota Golden Gophers by a 39–6 score before approximately 70,000 spectators at Michigan Stadium. The Wolverines took a 6–0 lead in the first quarter on a four-yard touchdown pass from Fred Trosko to Elmer Gedeon, the Wolverines' first touchdown against Minnesota since 1931. From that point forward, Minnesota responded with 39 unanswered points and intercepted six Michigan passes. Minnesota out-gained Michigan by a total of 389 yards to 31 yards. The loss was Michigan's fourth in a row against Minnesota. Minnesota star halfback Andy Uram sustained a broken wrist in the game. The 1937 Golden Gophers went on to win the Big Ten championship and were ranked No. 5 in the final AP Poll.

Week 4: at Iowa

On October 23, 1937, Michigan defeated Iowa, 7–6, before a crowd of approximately 20,000 in Iowa City. The victory was the first for Michigan over a Big Ten opponent since 1935. Tex Stanton scored Michigan’s touchdown on a three-yard run in the second quarter. Fred Trosko kicked the point after touchdown. Iowa quarterback Nile Kinnick, who went on to win the 1939 Heisman Trophy, returned a punt 76 yards for a touchdown in the third quarter.  Michigan tackle Bill Smith blocked Kinnick’s kick for the point after touchdown to preserve Michigan's lead. The Wolverines out-gained the Hawkeyes by 180 yards to 106 yards.

Week 5: at Illinois

On October 30, 1937, Michigan defeated Illinois by a 7–6 score before a crowd of approximately 29,000 at Memorial Stadium in Champaign, Illinois. After a scoreless first half, the Illini took a 6–0 lead in the third quarter as Willard Cramer recovered a fumble in Michigan's end zone for a touchdown. However, the kick for extra point was low. Shortly thereafter, Michigan quarterback Bill Barclay intercepted a Minnesota pass near midfield. After moving the ball to Illinois' 36-yard line, Fred Trosko threw a pass caught by a wide-open John Nicholson at the 15-yard line.  Nicholson ran the remaining 15 yards untouched for a touchdown. Trosko converted the kick for point after touchdown to give the Wolverines a 7–6 lead. Michigan played well on defense, holding the Illini to only 56 total yards from scrimmage. The game was Illinois' homecoming game and included a celebration in honor of Robert Zuppke's 25th anniversary as the team's football coach.

Week 6: Chicago

On November 6, 1937, Michigan defeated the Chicago Maroons, 13–12, before a crowd of approximately 20,000 at Michigan Stadium. Chicago scored touchdowns in the second and third quarters to take a 12–0 lead.  With four minutes remaining in the game, the Wolverines rallied for two touchdowns. Stark Ritchie, who had just been brought into the game as a substitute, scored on a 41-yard sweep around the left side with a key block by Hercules Renda on Chicago's right end. Danny Smick kicked the extra point to narrow Chicago's lead to five points. On the ensuing drive, Smick hit the Chicago ball carrier at full speed; the ball came loose and Smick recovered the fumble at Chicago's 21-yard line with two minutes left in the game. A Chicago penalty advanced the ball to the 16-yard line, and Stark Ritchie then ran through the right end to the six-yard line. Chicago held on the next three plays, but Ritchie ran for the winning touchdown on fourth down. Michigan took the lead with one minute left to play. Smick's kick for extra point was unsuccessful.  Ralph Heikkinen intercepted a Chicago pass at midfield as time ran out.

Week 7: at Penn

On November 7, 1937, Michigan won its fourth consecutive game, defeating Penn by a 7–0 score on a wet, muddy Franklin Field in Philadelphia. Michigan scored with a minute and 20 seconds remaining in the first half on a six-yard touchdown pass from Stark Ritchie to Norm Purucker. Guard George Marzonie kicked the extra point. The touchdown was set up when Ralph Heikkinen recovered a fumbled forward lateral. A Penn player, Walter Shinn, threw a punch at Michigan end John Nicholson during the scrum for the loose ball, resulting in Shinn's ejection and a penalty that moved the ball to the Penn 33-yard line. Penn out-gained Michigan in the game by a total of 94 yards to 74 yards. After the game, a small contingent of Michigan fans attempted unsuccessfully to tear down the goalpost, but their effort was thwarted by a much larger group of Penn students.

Week 8: Ohio State

On November 20, 1937, Michigan concluded its season with its annual rivalry game against an Ohio State team ranked No. 13 in the AP Poll. The game was played in the snow before a crowd of approximately 60,000 at Michigan Stadium.  Ohio State dominated the game and won by a 21–0 score. Ohio State touchdowns were scored by Miller (two) and Nardi (one); the Buckeyes also scored two points on a safety in the second quarter. The Buckeyes out-gained the Wolverines by 225 rushing yards to 63 and by 101 passing yards to 37. The defeat was the fourth in a row to the Buckeyes.  Prior to the 1937 season, Michigan had not lost four consecutive games to any opponents, but the 1937 season brought the team's fourth consecutive losses against all three major rivals – Michigan State, Minnesota, and Ohio State.

Post-season
On November 23, 1937, the Michigan football team elected tackle Fred Janke as captain of the 1938 team. At the same time, guard Ralph Heikkinen was selected as the most valuable player on the 1937 squad.

Heikkinen was also the only Michigan player to receive first-team honors on the 1937 All-Big Ten Conference football team. He was selected as a first-team tackle by the United Press and received second-team honors from the Associated Press. Tackle Don Siegel also received second-team honors from the Associated Press.

Harry Kipke was fired as Michigan's head coach on December 9, 1937.  According to newspaper reports, Kipke was "on the outs" with athletic director Fielding H. Yost, and the Board in Control of Physical Education had come to the unanimous opinion that Kipke was "incompetent".

Candidates to replace Kipke included Gus Dorais,  George Veenker, Gar Davidson, Dutch Clark, Howard Jones, and Ivy Williamson. Fritz Crisler was ultimately hired in February 1938 as Kipke’s replacement.

Players

Varsity letter winners
The following 26 players received varsity letters for their participation on the 1937 Michigan football team.  For players who were starters, the list also includes the number of games started by position. Players who started at least half of Michigan's games are shown in bold.

William C. Barclay, quarterback, senior, Flint, Michigan – started 3 games at right halfback
John Brennan, guard, junior, Racine, Wisconsin – started 7 games at left guard
Robert D. Campbell, halfback, senior, Ionia, Michigan
Douglas Farmer, fullback, senior, Hinsdale, Illinois – started 8 games at quarterback
Elmer Gedeon, end, junior, Cleveland, Ohio – started 2 games at left end
Ralph Heikkinen, guard, junior, Ramsay, Michigan – started 7 games at right guard
Fred Janke, fullback, junior, Jackson, Michigan – started 2 games at left tackle
Archie Kodros, center/guard, sophomore, Alton, Illinois – started 7 games at center
Louis Levine, quarterback, junior, Muskegon Heights, Michigan
Earl B. Luby, tackle, senior, Chicago, Illinois
George A. Marzonie, guard, senior, Flint, Michigan – started 1 game at right guard
John E. Nicholson, Jr., end, junior, Elkhart, Indiana – started 6 games at left end, 1 game at right end
Frederick C. "Fred" Olds, guard/tackle, junior, East Lansing, Michigan – started 1 game at left guard
Ernest A. Pederson, guard, senior, Grand Blanc, Michigan
Norm Purucker, halfback, Poland, Ohio – started 1 game at right halfback
Hercules Renda, halfback, sophomore, Jochin, West Virginia – started 3 games at right halfback
Joseph M. Rinaldi, center, senior, Elkhart, Indiana – started 8 games at center
Stark Ritchie, halfback, senior, Battle Creek, Michigan – started 1 game at center; 3 games at left halfback
Roland Savilla, tackle, sophomore, Gallagher, West Virginia – started 2 games at right tackle
Donald J. Siegel, tackle, junior, Royal Oak, Michigan – started 6 games at left tackle
Danny Smick, end, junior, Hazel Park, Michigan – started 6 games at right end
William A. Smith, tackle, sophomore, Riverside, California – started 6 games at right tackle
Edward Stanton, fullback, junior, Charleston, West Virginia – started 7 games at fullback
Fred Trosko, halfback, sophomore, Flint, Michigan – started 5 games at left halfback
Arthur Valpey, end, senior, Detroit – started 1 game at right end
Clarence H. Vandewater, guard, junior, Holland, Michigan

Varsity reserve
The following players were identified as varsity reserves on the roster of the 1937 Michigan football team.
Harold Floersch, end, junior, Wyandotte, Michigan
R. Wallace Hook, Jr., halfback, junior, East Grand Rapids, Michigan
John H. Kinsey, fullback, sophomore, Plymouth, Michigan – started 1 game at fullback
Dennis A. Kuhn, tackle, sophomore, River Rouge, Michigan
Derwood D. Laskey, halfback, sophomore, Milan, Michigan
Harry K. Mulholland, fullback, sophomore, Bay City, Michigan
Norman J. Nickerson, fullback, junior, Detroit, Michigan
Robert P. Piotrowski, halfback, junior, Manistee, Michigan
Joseph C. Rogers, end, sophomore, Royal Oak, Michigan
Horace Tinker, center, sophomore, Battle Creek, Michigan
Frederick C. Ziem, guard, senior, Pontiac, Michigan

All-freshman team
The 1937 all-freshman team included a nucleus of players, including Tom Harmon and Forest Evashevski, that would propel Michigan to the top tier of college football programs when Fritz Crisler took over as head coach in 1938. 
Pierce Barker, Detroit, Michigan
Richard C. Bennett, Springfield, Illinois
Irwin S. Clamage, Detroit, Michigan
George L. Clark, Carthage, Illinois
Edward W. Czak, Elyria, Ohio
Forest Evashevski, Detroit, Michigan
Thomas G. Ford, East Grand Rapids, Michigan
Harlin E. Fraumann, Pontiac, Michigan
Ralph Fritz, New Kensington, Pennsylvania
William H. Gambill, Centralia, Illinois
Jack D. Grant, Chicago, Illinois
Tom Harmon, Gary, Indiana
William J. Hermann, Detroit, Michigan
Robert Horst, Detroit, Michigan
Reuben Kelto, Bessemer, Michigan
Thomas P. Kieckhefer, Milwaukee, Wisconsin
Harry E. Kohl, Dayton, Ohio
Paul Kromer, Lorain, Ohio
Robert E. Larkin, Oak Park, Illinois
Blaz A. Lucas, Jr., Gary, Indiana
George S. Manolakas, Detroit, Michigan
Howard H. Mehaffey, Pittsburgh, Pennsylvania
Jack Meyer, Elyria, Ohio
James R. Miller, Highland Park, Michigan
Charles E. Norton, Lawrenceburg, Tennessee
Arthur Paddy, Benton Harbor, Michigan
Lester Persky, Cleveland Heights, Ohio
Richard G. Pugh, Detroit, Michigan
Charles R. Ross, Cambridge, Massachusetts
Robert S. Ross, Menasha, Wisconsin
Melvin S. Schlemenson, Memphis, Tennessee
Robert M. Seltzer, Chicago, Illinois
Edward Shelberg, Lansing, Michigan
Jacob Speelman, Jr., Lansing, Michigan
Dave Strong, Helena, Montana
George S. Thomas, Detroit, Michigan
William E. Vollmer, Manistee, Michigan
Colin C. Weymouth, Detroit, Michigan

Awards and honors
Captain: Joe Rinaldi
All-Conference: Ralph Heikkinen (AP-2, UP-1); Don Siegel (AP-2)
Most Valuable Player: Ralph Heikkinen
Meyer Morton Award: Fred Trosko

Coaching staff
Head coach: Harry Kipke
Assistant coaches
 Backfield coach: Wally Weber
 Line coach: Hunk Anderson
 End coach: Bennie Oosterbaan
Trainer: Ray Roberts
Manager: Fred Colombo, assisted by John Fecknay, Ralph Dubois, Warren Slater, Philip Woodworth

References

External links
 1937 Football Team -- Bentley Historical Library, University of Michigan Athletics History

Michigan
Michigan Wolverines football seasons
Michigan Wolverines football